Antoine Richepanse (25 March 1770 – 3 September 1802) was a French general and colonial administrator.

Richepanse was born in Metz as the son of an officer of the Conti-Dragoon Regiment. When the French Revolution started Richepanse distinguished himself in the early battles of the French Revolutionary War, and by 1794, he had been promoted to général de brigade.

Fighting at Siegburg (June 1796) and Altenkirchen, he was promoted to général de division. In 1797 he fought in the Army of Sambre-et-Meuse under the command of Hoche. Richepanse distinguished himself in the Neuwied, where the Austrians lost 8000 men, 27 cannons and 7 colors. In 1800, he was part of the Army of the Rhine under Moreau, which defeated the Austrians at Hohenlinden in which he played a conspicuous part.

In 1801 he was appointed by the First Consul Napoléon Bonaparte as governor of Guadeloupe. There, he paved the way for the restoration of slavery, which had been abolished by the French Revolution in 1794 and reappeared in Guadeloupe in 1802 (in practice) and 1803 (in law). 

Not long after his arrival in Guadeloupe, he contracted yellow fever from which he died.

References

1770 births
1802 deaths
Military personnel from Metz
French generals
French colonial governors and administrators
Deaths from yellow fever
French Republican military leaders of the French Revolutionary Wars
Names inscribed under the Arc de Triomphe